Ray Singer may refer to:

 Ray Singer (writer) (1916–1992), American writer and producer
 Ray Singer (record producer), British record producer and owner of Singer Records